Abdul Saboor Qani is an Afghan politician and former governor of Herat Province. Appointed 15 June 2021, he was the governor during the 2021 Taliban offensive and surrendered to the Taliban on 13 August 2021 after the Fall of Herat. The day before, he said that Taliban attacks had been pushed back. Qani was previously the senior deputy minister for the Ministry of Interior Affairs for a year and a half.

References 

Governors of Herat Province
Living people
Year of birth missing (living people)
Place of birth missing (living people)
Afghan military officers